Synanon is a US-founded social organization created by Charles E. "Chuck" Dederich Sr. in 1958 in Santa Monica, California, United States. It is currently active in Germany. 

Originally established as a drug rehabilitation program, by the early 1960s, Synanon became an alternative community centered on group truth-telling sessions that came to be known as the "Synanon Game," a form of attack therapy. The group ultimately became a cult called the Church of Synanon in the 1970s. 

Synanon disbanded in 1991 due to members being convicted of criminal activities (including attempted murder) and retroactive loss of its tax-exempt status with the Internal Revenue Service (IRS) due to financial misdeeds, destruction of evidence, and terrorism. It has been called one of the "most dangerous and violent cults America had ever seen."

Beginnings 
Charles Dederich, a member of Alcoholics Anonymous (AA), was known to speak for hours uninterrupted at AA meetings.
Those suffering from addictions to illegal drugs were not always welcomed into AA because it was considered that their addiction issues were significantly different from those suffered by alcoholics. It is claimed that Dederich, after taking LSD,
decided to create his own program to respond to their needs. He was said to have coined the phrase "today is the first day of the rest of your life".
After his small group, called "Tender Loving Care", gained a significant following, Dederich incorporated the organization into the Synanon Foundation in 1958.
Synanon is a word of his own invention integrating togetherness (“syn”) with the unknown (“anon”).

Synanon began as a two-year residential program, but Dederich soon concluded that its members could never graduate, because a full recovery was impossible. The program was based on testimony of fellow group members about their tribulations and urges of relapsing, and their journeys to recovery.

The Synanon organization also developed a business that sold promotional items. This became a successful enterprise that for a time generated roughly $10 million per year.

In 1959, Synanon moved from their small storefront to an abandoned armory on the beach.
In 1967, Synanon purchased the Club Casa del Mar, a large beachside hotel in Santa Monica, as its headquarters and a dormitory for those undergoing treatment for drug addiction.
Later on, Synanon acquired a large building that had been the home of the Athens Athletic Club, in Oakland, California, and then transformed it into a residential facility for Synanon's members.
Outsiders were permitted to attend the "Synanon Game" there as well.
Children were reared communally in the Synanon School.

Professionals, even those without drug addictions, were invited to join Synanon. The New York psychiatrist Daniel Casriel M.D. visited in 1962, lived there in 1963 and wrote a book about his experiences. He later founded AREBA, the oldest surviving private addiction treatment centre in the United States, as well as  Daytop Village, one of the world's largest therapeutic communities.

Control over members occurred through the "Game". The "Game" was presented as a therapeutic tool, and likened to a form of group therapy; but it has been criticized as a form of a "social control", in which members humiliated one another and encouraged the exposure of one another's innermost weaknesses.
Beginning in the mid-1970s, women in Synanon were required to shave their heads, and married couples were made to break up and take new partners. Men were given forced vasectomies, and a few pregnant women were forced to have abortions.

The film director George Lucas needed a large group of people with shaved heads for the filming of his movie THX 1138 and hired some of his extras from Synanon. Robert Altman hired members of Synanon to be extras for the gambling scenes in his movie California Split.

Practices 

Entrance into the Synanon community required a strong initial commitment. Newcomers were first interviewed by Synanon leadership to gain entrance into the community. Upon their arrival, those newcomers were forced to quit using drugs cold turkey, going through withdrawal for the first few days in the program. Furthermore, for their first ninety days in the community, members were expected to cease contact with outside friends and family.

During its first decade, Synanon members entered into a 1–2-year program in three stages aimed at preparing members to reenter greater society. During the first stage, members did community and housekeeping labor. During the second stage, members worked outside of the community but still resided within the community. Finally, during the third stage, members both worked and lived outside of the community, but still attended regular meetings. After Synanon's transition into an alternate society in 1968, this program changed to a "lifetime rehabilitation" program, with the premise that drug addicts would never truly be well enough to return to society.

One of the most distinguishing practices of the Synanon community was a therapeutic practice commonly referred to as "The Game." The game was a session during which one member would talk about themselves and then endure intense criticism by their peers. During this practice, members were encouraged to be critical of everything, using harsh and profane language. The practice has been charactized as a form of attack therapy. Outside of The Game, members were required to act civilly to each other. While in The Game, members criticized each other, but left as friends and supportive community members. The Game served not only as Synanon's most prominent form of therapy and personal change, but also worked as a way for leaders to collect the opinions of community members.  Because there was no hierarchy in The Game, members could freely criticize Synanon's highest leadership, who would then take member concerns into consideration when deciding policy.

The game turned into a 72-hour version and was admitted by Dederich to be brainwashing. The game was eventually used to pressure people to submit to Dederich's will, abort pregnancies, undergo vasectomies, and commit violence.

Dederich eventually changed his way of thinking about Synanon and transformed it into something resembling a human progressive group. Synanon moved to create schooling for members, and Dederich wanted members to mentally change in order to improve society on the outside. The school was headed by Al Bauman, who believed in an innovative philosophy and aimed to teach children in the same manner to think differently. The school attracted lawyers, screenwriters, and business executives, all wanting to educate their children in a progressive environment.

Lifetime rehabilitation concept
Beginning in 1964, the legal authorities began to investigate Synanon's practices. The concept of "lifetime rehabilitation" did not agree with therapeutic norms, and it was alleged that the Synanon group was running an unauthorized medical clinic. Synanon expanded an old Trans-Pacific Marconi RCA radio station in Tomales Bay now Marconi Conference Center State Historical Park. It was alleged that on remote properties in California such as at Marshall in Marin County and in Badger, Tulare County, Synanon had erected buildings without the legally-required permits, had created a trash dump, and built an airstrip. Taxation issues also arose. In response to these accusations, Dederich declared that Synanon was a tax exempt religious organization, the "Church of Synanon".

Legal problems continued, despite this change. Children who had been assigned to Synanon began running away, and an "underground railroad" had been created in the area that sought to help them return to their parents. Beatings of Synanon's opponents and its ex-members, "splittees", occurred across California.  Beatings occurred in Synanon basements. A state Grand Jury in Marin County issued a scathing report in 1978 that attacked Synanon for the very strong evidence of its child abuse, and also for the monetary profits that flowed to Dederich. The Grand Jury report also rebuked the governmental authorities involved for their lack of oversight, although it stopped short of directly interceding in the Synanon situation.

Though many San Francisco area newspapers and broadcasters covered the Synanon case, they were largely silenced by legal action from Synanon's lawyers, who made claims of libel. These lawsuits ultimately turned out to be a large part of Synanon's undoing, by giving journalists access to Synanon's own internal documents.

Criminal activity and collapse 
Synanon is purported to have been involved in several criminal activities, such as the disappearance of Rose Lena Cole in late 1972, or early 1973. Cole had received a court order to enroll in Synanon before she disappeared. She has not been seen or heard from since. Initially Synanon did not support violence; Dederich later changed the rules to allow for violence in order to maintain control. Much of the violence by Synanon had been carried out by a group within Synanon called the "Imperial Marines".  Over 80 violent acts were committed, including mass beatings that hospitalized teenagers and ranchers who were beaten in front of their families. People who left the organization were at risk of physical violence for being a "splittee"; one ex-member, Phil Ritter, was beaten so severely that his skull was fractured and he subsequently fell into a coma with a near-fatal case of bacterial meningitis.

In mid-1978, the NBC Nightly News produced a news segment on the controversies surrounding Synanon. Following this broadcast, several executives of the NBC network and its corporate chairman allegedly received hundreds of threats from Synanon members and supporters. NBC continued with a series of reports on the Synanon situation on the NBC Nightly News. The Point Reyes Light, a small-circulation weekly newspaper in Marin County, would later receive the Pulitzer Prize for Public Service for their covering Synanon at a time when other news agencies avoided reporting. Several weeks after NBC began receiving threats, on October 10, 1978, two Synanon members placed a de-rattled rattlesnake in the mailbox of attorney Paul Morantz of Pacific Palisades, California. Morantz had successfully brought suit on behalf of people who were being held against their will by Synanon. The snake bit him, and he was hospitalized for six days. This incident, along with the press coverage, prompted an investigation by the police and government into Synanon.

Six weeks later, the Los Angeles Police Department performed a search of the ranch in Badger that found a recorded speech by Dederich in which he said, "We're not going to mess with the old-time, turn-the-other-cheek religious postures... Our religious posture is: Don't mess with us. You can get killed dead, literally dead... These are real threats", he snarled. "They are draining life's blood from us, and expecting us to play by their silly rules. We will make the rules. I see nothing frightening about it... I am quite willing to break some lawyer's legs, and next break his wife's legs, and threaten to cut their child's arm off. That is the end of that lawyer. That is a very satisfactory, humane way of transmitting information. I really do want an ear in a glass of alcohol on my desk." During the investigations researchers also came across multiple lawsuits and arrests against Synanon members.

Dederich was arrested while drunk on December 2, 1978. Two other Synanon residents, Joe Musico and Lance Kenton (son of the musician Stan Kenton) were also arrested and pleaded "no contest" to charges of assault and conspiracy to commit murder. Lance Kenton was sentenced to a year in prison. While his associates went to jail, Dederich received probation because his doctors claimed that due to ill health he would most likely die in prison. As a condition of probation, he was disallowed from taking part in managing Synanon. Dederich died on 28 February 1997, at age 83, after a series of strokes; the cause of death was cardiorespiratory failure.

Synanon struggled to survive without its leader, and also with a severely tarnished reputation. The Internal Revenue Service revoked the organization's tax-exempt status and ordered them to pay $17 million in back taxes. This bankrupted Synanon, which formally dissolved in 1991.

Synanon's influence in the behavior-modification field 
Mel Wasserman, influenced by his Synanon experience, founded CEDU Education. CEDU's schools used the confrontation model of Synanon.  The CEDU model was widely influential on the development of parent-choice, private-pay residential programs. People originally inspired by their CEDU experience developed or strongly influenced a significant number of the schools in the therapeutic boarding school industry.

Father William B. O'Brien, the founder of New York's Daytop Village, included Synanon's group encounters and confrontational approach in his research into addiction treatment methods.

The author, journalist and activist Maia Szalavitz claims to chart the influence of Synanon in other programs including Phoenix House, Straight, Incorporated and Boot Camps in addition to those mentioned above.

Popular depictions
Straight Life: The Story of Art Pepper includes several chapters (21 - 23) about living at Synanon from 1969 - 1971.

The 1965 Columbia Pictures movie Synanon, directed by Richard Quine, was set at (and filmed in) Synanon; it starred Edmond O'Brien as Chuck Dederich, as well as Chuck Connors, Stella Stevens, Richard Conte, and Eartha Kitt.

The 1984 TV movie Attack on Fear, directed by Mel Damski, written by T.S. Cook, an account of the journalists who exposed the abuses; it starred Paul Michael Glaser, Linda Kelsey, and Barbara Babcock.

Episode 22 of Mannix depicts Synanon members involved with a fictitious 1945 Daily Clarion bombing that killed 14 men.

Synanon is referred to in Bob Dylan's song "Lenny Bruce", from his album Shot of Love (Bruce "never made it to Synanon"). It is also referred to in the song "Opening Doors" from Stephen Sondheim's musical Merrily We Roll Along, which mentions it as a hypothetical song title in a satirical revue of the 1960s.

Synanon is mentioned in Joan Didion's 1979 essay The White Album. Philip K. Dick makes several references to Synanon in his 1977 novel A Scanner Darkly  and 1981 novel VALIS.

Deborah Swisher, a former Synanon member, recounts her experiences growing up in several Synanon communes in her one-woman show Hundreds of Sisters and One Big Brother.

Hollywood Park: A Memoir, by Mikel Jollett (founder of The Airborne Toxic Event) was published in May 2020 and describes Jollett's life in, and escape from Synanon.

Daniel Gumbiner refers to this cult in his National Book Award-longlisted, The Boatbuilder. The main character discusses a drug rehabilitation cult "The Church of Niebor," which is based on Synanon.

The group is featured in the 2021 book Cultish: The Language of Fanaticism by American linguist Amanda Montell. Montell's father was a member as a child and spoke freely to Amanda about his experience in Synanon.

On September 26, 2022, the TrueAnon podcast also released a 5-part series on the history of Synanon called The Game. Throughout the series, one of the show's hosts, Brace Belden, talks about his childhood experience in a correctional, co-ed private facility called the Monarch School, which has been closed due to allegations of widespread abuse under the watch of its founder, Patrick McKenna, a Synanon disciple.

On January 13, 2023, The Last Podcast on the Left released an episode on Synanon as part of their series on the troubled teen industry.

See also
Attack therapy
Human potential movement
Prop 36
Élan School
Cenikor Foundation
CEDU
The Seed (organisation)

References

External links
 A German offshoot of Synanon 

Addiction organizations in the United States
Therapeutic community
Social history of California
New religious movements
Mental health organizations in California
Cults
Addiction and substance abuse organizations